Stephen Dunn (December 26, 1894 – February 3, 1980) was an American sound engineer. He won two Academy Awards in the category Best Sound Recording and was nominated twice more in the same category.

Selected filmography
Won
 This Land Is Mine (1943)
 The Bells of St. Mary's (1945)

Nominated
 Once Upon a Honeymoon (1942)
 Music in Manhattan (1944)

References

External links

1894 births
1980 deaths
American audio engineers
Best Sound Mixing Academy Award winners
People from Modesto, California
Engineers from California
20th-century American engineers